The Freedom Party of Manitoba, founded as the Libertarian Party of Manitoba, is a provincial political party in Manitoba, Canada, advocating cannabis legalization.

History
The party was created in the mid-1980s and formally changed its name in early 2005, and in 2007 became the Freedom Party of Manitoba. The LPM ran four candidates in the provincial election of 1986, one fewer than was required for official party certification. It achieved ballot status in 1988 with six candidates, and ran five in 1990. The LPM ran six candidates in 1995, six again in 1999 and five in 2003. It never came close to electing a member to the legislature, and Buors has acknowledged the LPM is a marginal political force in the province. Like other "fringe parties", the LPM claims to present ideas to the public which are ignored by mainstream organizations.

The party appears to have been founded by Clancy Smith, who is still an active member. Dennis Rice became party leader at some point in the early 1990s, and stepped down two days after the 2003 election was called. Chris Buors was chosen without opposition as Rice's replacement, and led the party into the election. Like most right-libertarian parties, the LPM advocated the view that government activities which affect the lives of citizens (whether in social or economic matters) be kept to a minimum.

Buors, who led the party in the 2003 election, is a marijuana-rights activist and has also run as a candidate for the Marijuana Party of Canada. Buors is known as an activist in Canada's cannabis movement.  In 2005, he legally changed the party's name to the Manitoba Marijuana Party, on the advice and with the support of cannabis activist Marc Emery.

In early February 2007, James Cotton, expressed interest in changing the Party name and becoming Party Leader. All the proper forms for Elections Manitoba were gathered, signed, sealed and delivered and on February 27, 2007 it became the Freedom Party. It supports the full legalization of drugs, and has also called for the restriction of state powers on other issues. The party did not nominate candidates for the 2007 provincial election. James Cotton was the party leader while past leader Buors served as party president.

In May 2007, the Freedom Party of Manitoba failed to field the five candidates needed in Manitoba for a provincial party to remain registered in that province.  There have since been reports that the party has disbanded.

See also

 Libertarian Party of Canada

2007 establishments in Manitoba
2007 in cannabis
Cannabis in Manitoba
Cannabis political parties of Canada
Classical liberal parties
Defunct political parties in Canada
Libertarianism in Canada
Libertarian parties
Provincial political parties in Manitoba